August A. Busch Memorial Conservation Area is a  conservation area that is owned and managed by the Missouri Department of Conservation. Located in St. Charles County, Missouri, the land was purchased by the Department of Conservation with help from Alice Busch, the wife of August Anheuser Busch, Sr., in 1947 from the U.S. Government.

History 
During the 1940s portions of the area were used by the Weldon Spring Ordnance Works and the Department of the Army for the production of TNT and DNT. There are 100 old bunkers formerly used for the storage of TNT still in the area. The Atomic Energy Commission used the area from 1958 through 1967 for disposal of rubble contaminated by uranium and radium. In 1947 Alice Busch, the wife of August Anheuser Busch, Sr., donated $70,000 towards the cost of purchasing the area to use for conservation purposes as a memorial to her late husband.

Due to its history as a processing facility for DNT and uranium ore, the area is part of a superfund site. It was decontaminated to protect water quality and public health.

Geography 

Recreation 
The area provides a wide variety of recreational activities. There is a picnic area, pavilion, visitor center, viewing blind, fishing dock, and boat rentals in the area.

Hiking and biking 
There are several hiking and biking trails in the Conservation Area totaling .

Hunting and fishing
Hunting and fishing are permitted in the area given that the appropriate regulations are followed. There are 32 lakes stocked by the Department of Conservation and open to fishing. The lakes are stocked with trout, black bass, catfish, crappie, bluegill, sunfish, and muskellunge. Parts of the area are managed to support dove populations for hunting. According to the Department of Conservation, there are currently no concerns of contamination of the wildlife, from the nearby Superfund site. There is also a shooting range in the area.

Handicap accessibility 
There have been numerous improvements in the park to improve accessibility for wheelchair users.  These include ramps, concrete fishing areas, and boardwalks around nature viewing areas.

References 

Protected areas of St. Charles County, Missouri
Nuclear weapons infrastructure of the United States
Military Superfund sites
Conservation Areas of Missouri
Nature centers in Missouri